The Silver Slave is a lost 1927 silent film drama directed by Howard Bretherton and starring Irene Rich. It was produced and distributed by the Warner Brothers and a Vitaphone track of sound and effects was added, however there is no spoken dialogue.

Plot
Bernice Randall, who has forsaken the love of her sweetheart, Tom Richards, to marry for wealth, turns down Richards' proposal after the death of her husband, and she is denounced by him as a slave to silver. Lavishing the greater part of her fortune on her daughter, Janet, Bernice determines to give her the advantages she herself lacked. Despite her mother's disapproval, Janet scorns the affection of Larry Martin, a lifelong friend, after meeting Philip Caldwell, a wealthy sophisticate. Worried over Janet's growing attachment to Philip, Bernice determines to win Caldwell from her daughter, and in a confrontation involving the girl and Richards, now a millionaire, Janet is disillusioned in her mother and Caldwell. Learning of her mother's sacrifice, Janet forgives her and finds happiness with Larry.

Cast
Irene Rich as Bernice Randall
Audrey Ferris as Janet Randall
Holmes Herbert as Tom Richards
John Miljan as Philip Caldwell
Carroll Nye as Larry Martin

References

External links

1927 films
American silent feature films
Lost American films
Films directed by Howard Bretherton
Warner Bros. films
1927 drama films
American black-and-white films
Transitional sound drama films
Silent American drama films
1920s American films